9am to 5pm, 5pm to Whenever is the debut album of the Israeli musical and vocal duo TYP (stylized as T¥P) also known as The Young Professionals.

The original album was released September 12, 2011 in Israel on Polydor label under the title 09:00 to 17:00, 17:00 to Whenever.

Months later, when the band was signed to Universal Music Group, the album was released worldwide on June 18, 2012. The album was renamed 9am to 5pm, 5pm to Whenever to comply with English language conventions about timing.

The album contains the band's first international hit "D.I.S.C.O.".

Music videos have been done for four songs from the 2012 release of the album, "D.I.S.C.O.", "Young Professionals," "Be With You Tonight," and "20 Seconds". There is also a video with art inspired by "P.O.P." and a 12-minute short film sharing the title of its featured song, "Fuck Off Berlin," which was directed by Omer Tobi for use in association with the 2013 FLY Berlin Conference.

Track listing

09:00 to 17:00, 17:00 to Whenever release (2011)
"With Me" (3:51)
"P.O.P" (5:25)
"Young Professionals" (4:08)
"Dirty Messages" (3:07)
"Deserve" (4:00)
"Rumors" (3:51)
"Angry Alone" (5:04)
"Family Value"	(3:25)
"Bad Blood" (2:58)
"D.I.S.C.O" (4:06)
"Twenty Seconds" (3:55)
"Fuck Off Berlin" (3:20)
"Blood Makes Noise" (4:25)
"Wake Up" (5:37)

9am to 5pm, 5pm to Whenever release (2012)

Deluxe Edition

Bonus

Charts

References

2011 debut albums
Albums produced by Johnny Goldstein